NGC 1502 is a young open cluster of approximately 60 stars in the constellation Camelopardalis, discovered by William Herschel on November 3, 1787. It has a visual magnitude of 6.0 and thus is dimly visible to the naked eye. The asterism known as Kemble's Cascade appears to "flow" into NGC 1502, but this is just a chance alignment of stars.

The Trumpler class of NGC 1502 is II3p, indicating poorly populated cluster of stars (p) with a wide brightness range (3). The main sequence turnoff point is not well-defined, so the age estimates range from five to fifteen million years. It is heavily reddened due to interstellar dust. One of the brightest candidate members of the cluster is the eclipsing binary SZ Cam, which is a component of a visual double star ADS 2984. There are eleven variable stars and four candidate variables among the cluster members, including a β Cep, two periodic B-type variables, 2–3 eclipsing variables, and an RR Lyrae star. Five members of the cluster are chemically peculiar.

See also
 Alpha Camelopardalis, a runaway star possibly ejected from this cluster.

References

External links
 
 



1502
Camelopardalis (constellation)
Discoveries by William Herschel
Open clusters